Sabellastarte is a genus of marine polychaete worms in the family Sabellidae.

Species
The following species are classified in this genus:
Sabellastarte assimilis (McIntosh, 1885)
Sabellastarte fallax (Quatrefages, 1866)
Sabellastarte longa (Kinberg, 1866)
Sabellastarte magnifica (Shaw, 1800)
Sabellastarte sanctijosephi (Gravier, 1906)
Sabellastarte spectabilis (Grube, 1878)
Sabellastarte zebuensis (McIntosh, 1885)

References

Sabellida
Polychaete genera
Taxa named by Henrik Nikolai Krøyer